F65 or variant may refer to:

 , a Whitby-class frigate of the Royal Navy
 
 Nikon F65, a single-lens reflex camera
 Farman F.65, an airliner
 Sony F65, a digital motion picture camera